Moa Folke (born 25 March 1995) is a Swedish professional golfer who plays on the Ladies European Tour. In 2023, she won the Dimension Data Ladies Pro-Am and was runner-up at the Joburg Ladies Open.

Early life and amateur career
Folke was born in Tranås in 1995 and won several tournaments on the Skandia Tour junior circuit in Sweden.

She attended Murray State University 2014–2018 and played golf with the Murray State Racers women's golf team in the Ohio Valley Conference (OVC). She was a four-time All-OVC First Team selection and five-time medalist including the 2016 and 2017 OVC Championship. She was named the Ohio Valley Conference Golfer of the Year as a junior in 2017 and guided the Racers to back-to-back NCAA Championship appearances in 2017 and 2018

Professional career
Folke turned professional after she graduated in 2018. Before entering qualification for the LPGA Tour, she played in a few tournaments on the Swedish Golf Tour. She lost a playoff to Isabella Ramsay in the Carpe Diem Beds Open at Flommen Golf Club. In 2019, she won the Tegelberga Open, six strokes ahead of runner-up Linn Grant

In 2019, Folke joined the Symetra Tour. In her rookie season, she made two cuts in seven starts, her best finish a tie for 13th at the PHC Classic. With 2020 lost to the pandemic, in 2021 she made six cuts in 19 starts.

Playing in three Sunshine Ladies Tour events in early 2022, she held the lead after the first round of the Dimension Data Ladies Pro-Am, but eventually had to settle for a tie for 8th place.

Folke earned conditional status for the 2022 Ladies European Tour at Q-School. In her rookie season, she finished tied 14th at the Australian Ladies Classic – Bonville in April, and tied for 5th at the Mithra Belgian Ladies Open in May. In September, she led by two strokes at the halfway stage of the Women's Irish Open after firing a second round 62, ten under par. A final round 73 saw her finish tied 14th, five shots behind winner Klára Spilková.

In 2023, Folke shot a bogey-free eight-under-par 64 final round to win the Dimension Data Ladies Pro-Am in South Africa three strokes ahead of Anne-Lise Caudal. A few weeks later, she finished runner-up at the Joburg Ladies Open, after she held the lead by two strokes ahead of the final round.

Amateur wins
2012 Skandia Tour Riks #3 Örebro, McDonald's Junior Trophy
2013 Skandia Tour Riks #3 Halland
2016 Jan Weaver Invitational, Ohio Valley Conference Championship, Skandia Tour Riks #2 Stockholm, Chris Banister Classic
2017 Jan Weaver Invitational, Ohio Valley Conference Championship

Sources:

Professional wins (2)

Sunshine Ladies Tour wins (1)

Swedish Golf Tour wins (1)

References

External links

Swedish female golfers
Ladies European Tour golfers
Murray State Racers women's golfers
People from Tranås Municipality
1995 births
Living people